The 2022 OFC U-19 Championship was the 23rd edition of the OFC U-19/U-20 Championship, the biennial international youth football championship organised by the Oceania Football Confederation (OFC) for the men's under-19/under-20 national teams of Oceania.

The OFC announced on 4 March 2022 that the 2021 OFC U-20 Championship (originally the 2020 OFC U-19 Championship), which would have been hosted by Samoa, had been cancelled due to the COVID-19 pandemic, and Samoa would be retained to host the next edition in 2022. On 4 June 2021, the OFC announced the tournament had been moved to August from July.

The top two teams of the tournament qualified for the 2023 FIFA U-20 World Cup in Indonesia as the OFC representatives. New Zealand the defending champions, won the title for the eighth time, and qualified together with runners-up Fiji.

Teams
All 11 FIFA-affiliated national teams from the OFC are eligible to enter the tournament.

Starting from 2020, male youth tournaments no longer have a four-team qualifying stage, and all teams compete in one tournament.

Note: All appearance statistics include those in the qualifying stage (2016 and 2018).

Venues

Draw
The draw for the group stage was held on 19 July with teams seeded into pots based upon their ranking at the 2018 OFC U-19 Championship.

Squads

Players born on or after 1 January 2003 were eligible to compete in the tournament.

Group stage
All times are local, TAHT (UTC−10).

Group A

Group B

Group C

Ranking of third-placed teams

Due to groups having a different number of teams, the results against the fourth-placed teams in four-team groups will not be considered for this ranking.

Knockout stage

Bracket

Quarter-finals

Semi-finals
Winners qualify for 2023 FIFA U-20 World Cup.

Third place match

Final

Qualified teams for FIFA U-20 World Cup
The following two teams from OFC qualify for the 2023 FIFA U-20 World Cup.

1 Bold indicates champions for that year. Italic indicates hosts for that year.

Awards
The following awards were given at the conclusion of the tournament.

Goalscorers

Notes

References

External links
oceaniafootball.com

2022
2022–23 in OFC football
2022 in youth association football
2023 FIFA U-20 World Cup qualification
2022 Ofc U-19 Championship
September 2022 sports events in Oceania